The Saviem JL was a range of heavy/medium trucks manufactured by the French manufacturer Saviem, a subsidiary of Renault.

Characteristics
The Saviem JL range was based on the JL range from Somua. The JL was initially powered by engines from Alfa Romeo and other suppliers. In 1961, it adopted a revised front with double head lamps and was fitted with the Fulgur engines assembled at the Limoges factory, which would be part of Saviem. 

In 1963, as part of Saviem's agreements, some JL models incorporated MAN engines, changing its denomination and forming the new JM range. The ones which preserved the Fulgur engines were renamed as S (S9). The JL denomination was still sporadically used afterwards.

Engines
The JL started using a variety of engines, including Renaults, Henschels and Alfa Romeos. In 1961 it standardised the use of two Fulgur diesel units of 4.8L and 6.8L with a power output of 100 bhp and 150 bhp respectively.

References and sources
 The entry incorporates text translated from the Saviem French entry.

Vehicles introduced in 1957
Saviem